The Orkney vole (Microtus arvalis orcadensis) is a population of the common vole (Microtus arvalis) found in the Orkney Islands, off the northern coast of Scotland, as well as in the Channel Island of Guernsey. Orkney voles are about 10% larger than voles from other populations of the common vole. The common vole is absent from the rest of the British Isles.

Distribution and habitat
The Orkney vole occurs on eight islands of the group, Mainland, Sanday, Westray, Rousay, South Ronaldsay, Burray, Eday and Stronsay.

Taxonomy
In the past the populations on each of these islands have been named as subspecies, and the Orkney vole as a whole is considered by some taxonomists to be a subspecies of the common vole because of its size difference from the common vole.  However, others do not recognise any subspecies of the common vole, especially since DNA analysis indicates transport by Neolithic humans from what is now Belgium. Chromosome studies have shown however, that despite being twice as heavy as continental voles, they are conspecific and should be regarded as a subspecies.

Origin
Microtus arvalis does not occur in mainland Britain, nor elsewhere in the British Isles. It was hypothesised that the Orkney voles were a relict population, left behind when the land-bridge connecting Scotland and Orkney had disappeared, by the date that the more competitive Microtus agrestis had reached Northern Scotland. This theory has now been rejected on palaeontological, ecological, biological and geological grounds.

It is now accepted that they were introduced to the Orkney archipelago by humans in Neolithic times, possibly concealed in animal fodder. The oldest known radiocarbon-dated fossil of the species in Orkney is 4,600 years old: this marks the latest possible date of introduction.

References

Rodents of Europe
Biota of Orkney
Endemic fauna of Scotland
Endemic biota of the Scottish islands